Baku oil pipeline may refer to:

 Baku–Batumi pipeline
 Baku–Novorossiysk pipeline
 Baku–Tbilisi–Ceyhan pipeline, an oil pipeline from Azerbaijan to Turkey